Walter Richard Crichton  was  Archdeacon of  Madras from 1929 to 1937.
 
Crichton was educated at Trinity College, Dublin and ordained in 1908. After  curacies in Seagoe and Hillsborough he went with the Eccles Establishment to India. He served at Cannanore, Ootacamund, Secunderabad, Trichinopoly, Bellary, George Town, Chennai, Wellington and  Fort St. George. Returning from India in 1931 he held incumbencies at Ranmore and Plaistow.

He died on 29 April 1942.

References

20th-century Indian Anglican priests
Alumni of Trinity College Dublin
Archdeacons of Madras
Eccles Establishment people
1942 deaths
Year of birth missing